C More Series was a Scandinavian premium television channel showing movies and TV shows. It replaced Canal+ Comedy on April 1, 2010.

References

Defunct television channels in Sweden
Defunct television channels in Norway
Defunct television channels in Denmark
Defunct television channels in Finland
Television channels and stations established in 2010
Television channels and stations disestablished in 2019
Pan-Nordic television channels